Jo Dee Messina is the self-titled debut studio album of American country music singer Jo Dee Messina, released in 1996.

It was co-produced by country music artist Tim McGraw and Byron Gallimore, who has also produced all of McGraw's albums. The album's first two singles ("Heads Carolina, Tails California" and "You're Not in Kansas Anymore") both reached the Top 10 on the Billboard Hot Country Singles & Tracks (now Hot Country Songs) charts in 1996, while follow-ups "Do You Want to Make Something of It" and "He'd Never Seen Julie Cry" both failed to enter the Top 40.

The album reached number 22 on the Top Country Albums and number 146 on the Billboard 200. Seven years after its release, it was certified gold in the United States.

Track listing

Personnel
Compiled from liner notes.

Musicians
Jo Dee Messina - lead vocals, backing vocals
 Kenny Aronoff - drums
 Mike Brignardello - bass guitar
 Larry Byrom - acoustic guitar
 Glen Duncan - fiddle, mandolin
 Sonny Garrish - steel guitar, dobro
 Dann Huff - electric guitar
 Steve Nathan - piano, keyboards
 Danny Parks - acoustic guitar
 Tom Roady - percussion
 Matt Rollings - piano
 Brent Rowan - electric guitar
 Milton Sledge - drums
 Stephony Smith - backing vocals
 Cindy Walker - backing vocals
 Lonnie Wilson - drums
 Glenn Worf - bass guitar
 Bob Wray - bass guitar
 Curtis Young - backing vocals

Technical
 Byron Gallimore - production (all tracks), recording ("Every Little Girl's Dream")
 Julian King - recording
 Chris Lord-Alge - mixing
 Russ Martin - recording ("Heads Carolina, Tails California")
 Tim McGraw - production
 Doug Sax - mastering

Chart performance

Weekly charts

Year-end charts

Singles

References

1996 debut albums
Jo Dee Messina albums
Curb Records albums
Albums produced by Byron Gallimore
Albums produced by Tim McGraw